Energy Tower at City Center was a skyscraper proposed for the city of Midland, Texas. The old Midland County courthouse was demolished to make way for the skyscraper.

History
Energy Tower was planned to stand at 870 feet tall with 59 floors (6 floors below ground). Had it been built, the building would have been the sixth-tallest building in Texas.

The developers canceled the pending purchase agreement for the old Midland County Courthouse property, where they planned to build the project on September 10, 2014.

References

Buildings and structures in Midland, Texas
Mid